The Medical District of Augusta, Georgia, is a special-use zoning district located between downtown and Summerville. The district is bounded to the north by Walton Way, to the east by R.A. Dent Boulevard, to the west by Heard Avenue, and to the south by Wrightsboro Road. The district comprises a number of medical facilities and private medical companies.

Institutions
Augusta University
Medical College of Georgia (MCG)
Dental College of Georgia (DCG)
College of Allied Health Sciences
College of Nursing
College of Graduate Studies
Augusta University Health System
Augusta University Medical Center — 493 licensed beds
Children's Hospital of Georgia — 149 licensed beds
Ambulatory Care Center — has more than 80 outpatient clinics in one setting
Specialized Center — a 13-county Level I trauma center
Sports Center
Medical College of Georgia Institute of Molecular Medicine and Genetics
University Hospital — 581 licensed beds
University Heart and Vascular Institute
University Outpatient Center
University Breast Health Center
Georgia Radiation Therapy Center
Augusta Sickle Cell Center
Specialty Select Hospital — 34 licensed beds
Augusta Cancer Research Center
Norwood VA Medical Center — 155 licensed beds

See also

Walton Rehabilitation Hospital
Broad Street Historic District (Augusta, Georgia)
Summerville (Augusta, Georgia)

References

External links
Augusta Tomorrow: Medical District

Geography of Augusta, Georgia
Economy of Augusta, Georgia
Medical districts